Remember Right Now is the second album by the American band Spitalfield, released on June 17, 2003, through Victory. The entire album was featured in the video game Amped 2 for Xbox.  The album would mark a point where the band would leave their homes behind to tour in support of their newfound success; they collectively felt that Remember Right Now captured a point where they were at in their lives which was to serve as a keepsake for those moments. The album artwork features photos of various locations in the city of Chicago as well as the Chicago suburbs and their respective timestamps ranging from March 1, 2003 to March 20, 2003.

The song "Stolen From Some Great Writer" was included on the 2014 video game Watch Dogs.

Track listing
All songs written by Spitalfield

 "Those Days You Felt Alive" – 3:50
 "Kill the Drama" – 3:12
 "Five Days and Counting" – 3:04
 "I Loved the Way She Said 'L.A.'" – 3:19
 "Stolen from Some Great Writer" – 4:05
 "In the Same Lifetime" – 5:18
 "Am I Ready?" – 3:44
 "Fairweather Friend" – 2:46
 "You Can't Stop" – 4:07
 "Make My Heart Attack" – 3:24

Personnel
Credits adapted from Discogs

Spitalfield
J.D. Romero - drums
T.J. Minich - bass guitar, vocals
Daniel Lowder - guitar, vocals
Mark Rose - vocals, guitar

Production
Sean O'Keefe - production, engineering, mixing, programming
Greg Geary - pro-tools engineer
Mike Hari - assistant pro-tools engineer
Todd Ostertag - assistant engineer
Dominick Maita - mastering
Eric Remschneider - cello, cello arrangement

Design and layout
Jason Link - CD layout
Chris Strong - photography

References

Spitalfield albums
2003 albums
Victory Records albums
Albums produced by Sean O'Keefe